Parkland often refers to a park.

Parkland or Parklands may also refer to:

Geography
 Aspen parkland, a biome transitional between prairie and boreal forest (taiga)
 Landscaped parkland, a managed rural area associated with European country houses

Places

Australia
 Adelaide Park Lands, the figure eight of green space surrounding the Adelaide CBD and North Adelaide, and along both banks of the River Torrens within the City of Adelaide
 Parklands, Western Australia
 Parklands, Tasmania, a suburb of Burnie

Canada
 Parkland, Calgary, Alberta, a neighborhood in the city of Calgary
 Parkland County, a municipal district in Alberta, Canada
Sturgeon River—Parkland, a federal electoral district in Central Alberta
 Parkland Region, a region in Manitoba, Canada

United States
 Parkland, Florida; site of the Stoneman Douglas High School shooting
 Parkland, Illinois, an unincorporated community
 Parkland, Louisville, Kentucky, a neighborhood
 Parkland, Detroit, Michigan, a neighborhood
 Parkland, Philadelphia, a section of Philadelphia which houses a majority of Philadelphia's public parks
 Parkland, Washington
 Parkland, Wisconsin, a town
 Parkland (community), Wisconsin, an unincorporated community

Elsewhere
 Parklands, Nairobi, Kenya; a suburb of Nairobi
 Parklands, New Zealand, a suburb of Christchurch
 Parklands, Cape Town, South Africa; a suburb of Cape Town
 Parklands, Newcastle upon Tyne, England, UK; a district of the British city

Facilities and structures
 Parklands Hotel, a hotel in Perth, Scotland, UK

Schools
 Parkland College, Illinois, USA; a community college located in Champaign
 Parkland College (Saskatchewan), Canada; a junior, regional, and community college with several campuses in northeastern Saskatchewan
 Parklands College, Parklands, South Africa; a pre-primary through secondary private school
 Parkland Middle School, Rockville, Maryland, USA
 Parkland Secondary School, North Saanich, Vancouver Island, British Columbia, Canada

 Parkland High School (disambiguation)

Medical facilities
 Parkland Health & Hospital System, a hospital district in Dallas, Texas, USA
 Parkland Medical Center, a hospital in Derry, New Hampshire, USA
 Parkland Memorial Hospital, a public hospital in Dallas, Texas, USA

Groups, organizations, companies
 Parkland Fuel, a Canadian fuel company based in Calgary, Alberta
 Parkland Conference, Wisconsin, a defunct conference in the Wisconsin Interscholastic

Films
 Parklands (film), a 1996 Australian film
 Parkland (film), a 2013 American film about the aftermath of the assassination of John F. Kennedy

Other
 Parkland formula, used in medicine
 Stoneman Douglas High School shooting, in 2018, in Parkland, Florida, USA; the Parkland shooting, or simply "Parkland", which resulted in the deaths of 17 people and injuries of 17 others

See also

 Song of Parkland, an HBO documentary film about the Parkland shooting
 
 
 
 
 
 Park (disambiguation)
 Land (disambiguation)